
The following is a list of business schools in the Nordic countries:

Denmark
Aalborg University (Aalborg Universitet) – Aalborg
Aarhus School of Business (Handelshøjskolen i Århus) – Aarhus
Copenhagen Business School (Handelshøjskolen) – Copenhagen
University of Southern Denmark (Syddansk Universitet) – Odense

Finland
Aalto University, School of Business
Hanken School of Economics (Svenska handelshögskolan) – Helsinki and Vaasa
Helsinki School of Economics (Helsingin kauppakorkeakoulu) – Helsinki
Lappeenranta University of Technology School of Business (Lappeenranan teknillisen yliopiston kauppakorkeakoulu) – Lappeenranta
 Oulu Business School University of Oulu (Oulun yliopisto) – Oulu (AACSB–accredited school)
Turku School of Economics (Turun kauppakorkeakoulu) – Turku
University of Tampere School of Management (Tampereen yliopiston Johtamiskorkeakoulu) – Tampere
University of Vaasa Vaasa School of Economics (Vaasan yliopisto) – Vaasa
Åbo Akademi University Åbo Akademi School of Business and Economics (Handelshögskolan vid Åbo Akademi) - Turku
University of Jyväskylä School of Business and Economics (Jyväskylän Kauppakorkeakoulu) - Jyväskylä (AACSB - accredited school)

Iceland
Bifröst University (Háskólinn á Bifröst) – Borgarnes
Reykjavik University (Háskólinn í Reykjavík) – Reykjavík
University of Akureyri (Háskólinn á Akureyri) – Akureyri
University of Iceland (Háskóli Íslands) – Reykjavík

Norway
BI Norwegian Business School (Handelshøyskolen BI) – Headquarters in Oslo, five other locations throughout Norway
Bodø Graduate School of Business (Handelshøyskolen i Bodø), part of Bodø University College
Hauge School of Management (NLA Høgskolen Staffeldsgate), Oslo
Norwegian School of Economics and Business Administration (Norges Handelshøyskole), Bergen
Norwegian University of Life Sciences (Universitetet for Miljø– og Biovitenskap), Ås
Trondheim Business School (Trondheim Økonomiske Høgskole), part of Sør–Trøndelag University College
University of Agder Faculty of Economics and Social Sciences (School of Management) (Universitetet i Agder) – headquartered in Kristiansand
University of Stavanger (UiS Business School) (Universitetet i Stavanger – UiS)
University of Tromsø Faculty of Biosciences, Fisheries and Economics (School of Business and Economics) (UiT Norges Arktiske Universitet),  Tromsø

Sweden
Jönköping International Business School (Internationella Handelshögskolan) – Jönköping
Karlstad Business School (Karlstad universitet) – Karlstad
School of Business and Economics at the Linnaeus University (Ekonomihögskolan vid Linnéuniversitetet) – Kalmar and Växjö
Lund School of Economics and Management (Ekonomihögskolan i Lund) – Lund
School of Business, Economics and Law at the University of Gothenburg (Handelshögskolan vid Göteborgs universitet) – Gothenburg
Stockholm Business School (Stockholms universitet) – Stockholm
Stockholm School of Economics (Handelshögskolan i Stockholm) – Stockholm
Umeå School of Business (Handelshögskolan i Umeå) – Umeå

Business schools in Denmark
Business schools in Finland
Universities in Iceland
Business schools in Norway
Business schools in Sweden
Nordic countries